There Came an Echo is a real-time tactics video game developed for the PlayStation 4, Microsoft Windows through Steam and was released on 24 February 2015. The player can use a voice control system to direct their units around the battlefield to ensure a tactical advantage over the enemy. The game features voice actors Wil Wheaton, Ashly Burch, Yuri Lowenthal, Laura Bailey and Cassandra Morris.

The game was crowdfunded via Kickstarter for $115,570 (USD) by 3,906 backers, the requested budget was $90,000.  The game received further investment from Intel to implement Intel's RealSense technology.

Reception

Hardcore Gamer gave the game a 4 out of 5, saying "Iridium Studios has demonstrated how to properly create something fresh and exciting that encapsulates everything that the indie scene is capable of. Sure, its story can get a bit incoherent, its non-voice controls are awkward, and there are moments of spotty voice-recognition, but the good greatly outweighs what little bad there is."

Development
The developer has shown interest in bringing the game to Linux and SteamOS provided there is sufficient community support to do so. It was also mentioned that the main blocker is the proprietary voice libraries currently used by the game that do not support those platforms, so another library would need to be found that would suit the functional needs of the game.

References

External links
 
 Kickstarter page

2015 video games
Cancelled Xbox One games
Kickstarter-funded video games
Real-time strategy video games
MacOS games
Windows games
Linux games
PlayStation 4 games
Crowdfunded video games
Cyberpunk video games
Video games developed in the United States